Demeijerella is a genus of moths belonging to the subfamily Olethreutinae of the family Tortricidae.

Species
Demeijerella bicolorana (Bradley, 1961)
Demeijerella catharota (Meyrick, 1928)
Demeijerella chrysoplea (Diakonoff, 1975)
Demeijerella palleophyton Razowski, 2013
Demeijerella relapsa (Meyrick, 1928)
Demeijerella xanthorhina Diakonoff, 1954

See also
List of Tortricidae genera

References

External links
tortricidae.com

Eucosmini
Tortricidae genera
Taxa named by Alexey Diakonoff